Adam Braz (born June 7, 1981) is a Canadian former professional soccer player who last served as Technical Director of the Montreal Impact of Major League Soccer. Braz played on the Canada national team and in stints with Toronto FC in the Major League Soccer and the Montreal Impact in the USSF Division 2 Professional League.

Club career

College 
Braz was born in Montreal, Quebec, Canada, and is Jewish. He attended Herzliah High School in Ville Saint-Laurent.

He attended St. John's University in New York and played college soccer at Fairfield University for the Fairfield Stags men's soccer team from 1999 to 2001. In 2000, Braz was a first team all-MAAC defender and helped the Stags earn a No. 15 national ranking.
Braz received a bachelor's degree from the Fairfield University Dolan School of Business in 2001.

Professional 
In 2002, he signed with the Montreal Impact in the USL A-League. The following season he went abroad to play with Västerås SK in the Superettan. Braz returned to Montreal in 2004 and helped the Impact win the USL A-League Championship.

Braz was one of the first players to sign with MLS expansion franchise Toronto FC in the 2006–07 soccer offseason and made his MLS debut in Toronto FC's first game, a 2–0 loss to Chivas USA. Braz was transferred back to the Montreal Impact at the end of the 2007 season. During the 2009 USL season Braz contributed by helping the Impact clinch a playoff spot under new head coach Marc Dos Santos. He helped the Impact reach the finals where Montreal would face the Vancouver Whitecaps FC, this marking the first time in USL history where the final match would consist of two Canadian clubs. In the final Braz helped the Impact win the series 6–3 on aggregate. The victory gave the Impact their third USL Championship and also the victory marked Braz's second USL Championship. On October 6, 2009 Braz received Unsung Hero Award during the team's 2009 awards banquet. On November 26, 2009 Braz signed a new two-year deal with the club.

Braz announced his retirement on March 14, 2011 to become a team manager for the Impact.

International career 
Braz made his debut for Canada in a January 2004 friendly match against Barbados and, has earned a total of 12 caps. In July 2005, he was selected to play for Canada in the Gold Cup, where he played in all three games.

Career statistics

Honours 
Montreal Impact
 USL First Division Championship: 2004, 2009

See also
List of select Jewish football (association; soccer) players

References

External links
 Montreal Impact profile
 
 
 

1981 births
Living people
Soccer players from Montreal
Jewish Canadian sportspeople
Jewish footballers
Association football defenders
Canadian soccer players
Canada men's international soccer players
2005 CONCACAF Gold Cup players
2007 CONCACAF Gold Cup players
Canadian expatriate soccer players
Canadian expatriate sportspeople in the United States
Canadian expatriate sportspeople in Sweden
St. John's University (New York City) alumni
Fairfield Stags men's soccer players
Fairfield University Dolan School of Business alumni
Montreal Impact (1992–2011) players
Västerås SK Fotboll players
Toronto FC players
A-League (1995–2004) players
Major League Soccer players
USL First Division players
USSF Division 2 Professional League players
Expatriate soccer players in the United States
Expatriate footballers in Sweden
Anglophone Quebec people